Sandrino del Carmen Castec Martínez (born 18 June 1960) is a Chilean former footballer who played as a forward for clubs in Chile and Mexico.

Club career
A historical player of Universidad de Chile, Castec came to the youth system at the age of fourteen and made his professional debut in 1977 thanks to the coach Luis Ibarra, staying with the club until 1984. He had another two stints with the club in 1986–87 and 1989. In total, he made 201 appearances and scored 61 goals for the club and won the 1979 Copa Polla Gol.

In his homeland, he also played for Audax Italiano, where he made up a successful pair with Héctor Hoffens, Cobresal and Deportes Valdivia, his last club.

Abroad, he played for Cruz Azul in the Mexican Primera División alongside his compatriot Mariano Puyol.

International career
Castec made seven appearances for the Chile national team between 1980 and 1983. He scored a well remembered goal by chilena kick in a 2–2 draw against Argentina on 18 September 1980, the independence day of Chile.

Personal life
He is nicknamed El Bombardero Azul (The Blue Bomber) due to his high-scoring ability in Universidad de Chile.

Honours
Universidad de Chile
 Copa Polla Gol: 1979

References

External links
 
 
 Sandrino Castec at PlaymakerStats.com

1960 births
Living people
Footballers from Santiago
Chilean footballers
Chilean expatriate footballers
Chile international footballers
Universidad de Chile footballers
Audax Italiano footballers
Cruz Azul footballers
Cobresal footballers
Deportes Valdivia footballers
Chilean Primera División players
Primera B de Chile players
Liga MX players
Chilean expatriate sportspeople in Mexico
Expatriate footballers in Mexico
Association football forwards